Group Sex is a 2010 American comedy film written by Lawrence Trilling and Greg Grunberg. Trilling also directs, while Grunberg co-stars alongside Josh Cooke and Odette Yustman.

Plot
The story begins with two roommates and business partners, Andy and Jerry. Andy hears Vanessa singing at a bar and, lovestruck, follows her to a church, where he realizes she has joined sex addict meetings.

The film sees Andy attempting to get closer to sex addict Vanessa by attempting to fit in with the other sex addicts in the class. He takes on the persona of his sex-crazed roommate, but soon finds his efforts to help his new friends and to woo Vanessa are putting his job and work partnership with Jerry in jeopardy.

Cast

 Josh Cooke as Andy
 Greg Grunberg as Jerry
 Odette Yustman as Vanessa
 Robert Patrick Benedict as Donny
 Kym Whitley as Tiffany
 Tom Arnold as Herman
 Henry Winkler as Burton
 Lombardo Boyar as Ramon (credited as Lomabardo Boyar)
 Kathrine Narducci as Frannie
 Greg Germann as Reeves
 Kurt Fuller as Bloom
 Lisa Lampanelli as Lisa the Waitress
 Sandra Seeling as Eva
 Madeleine Lindley as Inga
 Sandra Taylor as Sandy
 Aaron Hill as Imposing Drunk Guy
 Michael Mazzara as Ralph
 Kirk Fox as Sex Addict #1
 Buddy Lewis as Sex Addict #2
 Ilya Jonathan Zaydenberg as Frat Boy with Paddle (credited as Llya Jonathan Zaydenberg)
 Christina DeRosa as Lucy
 James Denton as Luke

External links
 

2010 films
2010s sex comedy films
American sex comedy films
Casual sex in films
2010s English-language films
Films about sex addiction
2010 comedy films
2010s American films